Dupontia nitella is a species of small air-breathing land snails, terrestrial pulmonate gastropod mollusks in the family Euconulidae, the hive snails. This species is found in Mauritius and Réunion.

References

Dupontia (gastropod)
Gastropods described in 1868
Taxonomy articles created by Polbot